Hippa may refer to:
 Hippa (genus), a genus in the family Hippidae
 Hippa Island, an island in British Columbia belonging to the Haida Gwaii archipelago
 Heikki Hippa (H.Hippa, born 1943), a Swedish entomologist and arachnologist
 HIPAA, acronym for the Health Insurance Portability and Accountability Act of 1996, is frequently misspelled "HIPPA"